Jordi González Belart (born 26 September 1962 in Barcelona, Spain) is a Spanish journalist and television and radio presenter.

References

Living people
1962 births